Blåvand Lighthouse is a seacoast lighthouse in Blåvandshuk near Esbjerg, Denmark. Built in 1900 to replace an older light, the lighthouse lies on Blåvandshuk, the westernmost point in Denmark, making Blåvand Lighthouse the country's westernmost building.

The light can be seen up to  out at sea and flashes three times every 20 seconds.
The lighthouse has a square floor plan constructed on a granite plinth with brick walls, which are whitewashed in modern day. Access to the battlemented rooftop is by a winding staircase ascending through a small trapdoor.

See also

 List of lighthouses and lightvessels in Denmark

Gallery

References

External links 

Blåvand Lighthouse	at Marinas.com
Blåvand Lighthouse at waymarking.com

Lighthouses in Denmark